, known as I admire magical girls, and... in Japan, is a Japanese magical girl manga series written and illustrated by Akihiro Ononaka. It began serialization on Takeshobo's Storia Dash website in March 2019. Nine tankōbon volumes have been released as of March 2023.

J-Novel Club licensed the series for English release, and began pre-publishing it in March 2022. Previously, Coolmic licensed the series and published the manga divided in, as of late December 2022, 68 "episodes" consisting of about 10 pages each, on a smartphone-only website, under the title I Admire Magical Girls, and.... An anime television series adaptation has been announced.

Plot
Hiiragi Utena, a normal girl, is very passionate about magical girls; after being misled into joining an evil organization, she learns that there's also a twisted side to said passion.

Characters

Protagonist

Main character. Loves magical girls, but also loves them in a twisted sense. Accidentally joined Enormita against her will. She can animate dead objects with her Frusta dominazione (Domination Whip). She likes jelly and dislikes spicy food.

Magical Girls (Tres Magia)

Utena's classmate. Due to magical powers, the true identity of Tres Magia's members when transformed is unknown to Enormita's members and vice versa. A naïve, kind, pure-hearted girl.

She is a shrine maiden who likes to clean the temple. She loves peace and she prefers cute, modest outfits. She seems to secretly like spending time with Magia Baiser...

She is the tough, quick witted, no nonsense team member. She prefers cute/urban/somewhat punk outfits. She seems to be the team member who most wants to defeat Magia Baiser..

Evil Organization (Enormita)
 
 Mascot who tricked Hiiragi Utena into joining Enormita, and who's blackmailing her to stay.

Media

Manga
Written and illustrated by Akihiro Ononaka, Gushing over Magical Girls began serialization on Takeshobo's  website on March 29, 2019. It was also serialized on the company's  magazine, until it ceased publication in July 2019. As of March 2023, nine tankōbon volumes have been published.

Volume list

Anime
An anime television series adaptation was announced on March 16, 2023.

References

External links
 I admire magical girls, and... at Storia Dash 
 Gushing over Magical Girls at J-Novel Club
 I Admire Magical Girls, and... at Coolmic (smartphone only)
 

2019 manga
Anime series based on manga
BDSM literature
BDSM-related mass media
Comedy anime and manga
J-Novel Club books
Japanese webcomics
LGBT in anime and manga
Magical girl anime and manga
Takeshobo manga
Upcoming anime television series
Webcomics in print
Yuri (genre) anime and manga